Volleyball at the 1996 Summer Paralympics in Atlanta consisted of standing and sitting volleyball events for men.

Medal summary

Medal table

Men's standing volleyball team rosters 
Source: International Paralympic Committee

Men's sitting volleyball team rosters 
Source: International Paralympic Committee

References 

 

1996 Summer Paralympics events
1996
Paralympics